Fossa is a comune and town in the province of L'Aquila in the Abruzzo region of southern Italy.  Bernardino of Fossa was born in the town. The 2009 L'Aquila earthquake caused a bridge to collapse in Fossa, and caused extensive damage to the residential buildings in the town. The town was the epicentre of a major aftershock 5.4 Mw on April 7th 2009.

Main sights
 Castle
 Santa Maria ad Cryptas
 Necropolis of Fossa

Transport 
Fossa has a stop on the Terni–Sulmona railway, with trains to L'Aquila and Sulmona.

References